Spotted Dog Running at the Edge of the Sea (translit. Pegiy pyos, Begushchiy kraem morya) is a 1991 Soviet drama film directed by Karen Gevorkian. It won the Golden St. George and the Prix FIPRESCI at the 17th Moscow International Film Festival.

Adapted from the novel "Deniz Boyloy Jortkon Ala Dobot" (Kyrgyz language: Деңиз Бойлой Жорткон Ала Дөбөт, with same meaning of English title) by Chingiz Aitmatov.

Plot
The life of the Nivkh people, a small tribe living on the shores of the Sea of Okhotsk, is described.

The movie consists of two parts; first the parts shot on land (many of these parts are not in Aitmatov's novel) and the adventure at sea. The first part is a documentary shot in Sakhalin, the homeland of the Nivkhs, and presents sections from the lives of the locals. Examples of local culture are given, such as narrow houses living together in crowds, honor killings, bear hunting and bear ceremonies. The director showed how the tribe lived, hunted, danced and cast spells in real life.

The second part is based on Aitmatov's story. A boat is built with the ingenuity of the grandfather and the help of his sons. A ten-year-old boy goes fishing and seal hunting for the first time with his father, uncle and grandfather. However, they encounter a terrible problem. Mist descends on the sea, they get caught in the storm and lose the shore. When the drinking water is exhausted, the men decide to save the life of the child by sacrificing their own lives by putting themselves into the water one by one, each of them in turn.

Cast
 Bayarta Dambayev
 Aleksandr Sasykov
 Doskhan Zholzhaksynov
 Tokon Dayirbekov
 Lyudmila Ivanova

Bibliography
 Spotted Dog Running At The Edge Of the Sea, Kinoglaz, Clarke Fountain, Access date: 06 May 2022
 Pegiy pyos, Begushchiy kraem morya (1991), Goldposter, Ronald Levaco, Access date: 06 May 2022
 Pegiy pyos, Begushchiy kraem morya, Torino Film Festival, Museo Nazionale del Cinema, Access date: 06 May 2022

References

External links
 
 Famous Kazakh Actor Doskhan Zholzhaksynov Celebrates 70th Anniversary

1991 films
1991 drama films
1990s Russian-language films
Soviet drama films
Nivkh